Re:collection 93-08 is a compilation album by Swedish artist, Magnus Carlsson, released in November 2008. It consists of recording by him Barbados, Alcazar and his year as a solo artist.

Track listing

CD1
Live Forever - Magnus Carlsson          
 Kom hem - Barbados           
 Not a Sinner, Nor a Saint - Alcazar          
 Hold Me - Barbados          
 Nu kommer flickorna - Barbados            
 Världen utanför - Barbados          
 Physical - Alcazar           
 Lev livet! - Magnus Carlsson          
 Grand Hotel - Barbados           
 Belinda - Barbados          
 Waves of Love - Magnus Carlsson          
 Love Life - Alcazar           
 Aldrig i livet - Barbados          
 Alcastar - Alcazar             
 Din hemlighet - Barbados           
 Happy People (Swedish language-version) - Barbados          
 Wonderland - Alcazar           
 I mörkret här med dig - Barbados          
 Då Talar kärleken sitt språk - Magnus Carlsson           
 Always On My Mind - Barbados

CD2
 Start The Fire - Alcazar           
 Rosalita - Barbados          
 Stilla ro och nära - Åsa Jinder med Magnus Carlsson           
 The Lion Sleeps Tonight (Wimoweh) - Barbados           
 Allt som jag ser - Barbados           
 Gå din egen väg (On The Radio) - Magnus Carlsson, duet with Mela Tesfazion
 This Is The World We Live In - Alcazar           
 Mariann från Tylösand - Barbados           
 I Was Born This Way - Magnus Carlsson           
 Se mig - Barbados            
 Someday - Alcazar           
 Någonting har hänt - Barbados           
 Singing to Heaven - Alcazar           
 YMCA (Radio Version) - Magnus Carlsson           
 Walking In My Shoes - Magnus Carlsson           
 Heden - Magnus Carlsson            
 Alla dina kyssar - Barbados           
 Another Rainbow - Magnus Carlsson          
 Blå horisont - Barbados            
 Alltid leva (Live Forever - Swedish language-version) - Magnus Carlsson

Charts

Release history

References

2008 compilation albums
Compilation albums by Swedish artists
Magnus Carlsson albums